Canyon Creek Christian Academy (CCCA) was a private early education-12th grade Christian private school in Richardson, Texas. The school served families in various communities, including Richardson, Garland, and Plano. It opened in 1974. In the late 1980s many teachers and students left the school, alleging mismanagement, harassment, and interference in student affairs by the school's principal, a relative of the sponsoring church's pastor.
 The school fell under mismanagement once again in 2008 when David "Dave" Roberts was named Head of School. This mismanagement would not be survivable and Canyon Creek Christian Academy permanently closed its doors on June 30, 2017.

References

High schools in Collin County, Texas
High schools in Richardson, Texas
Christian schools in Texas
Educational institutions established in 1974
1974 establishments in Texas
Private K-12 schools in Texas
2017 disestablishments in Texas]
Educational institutions disestablished in 2017